Big Al's was one of the first topless bars in San Francisco and the United States since the mid-1960s. It was the first bottomless bar in San Francisco.
It is next to the Condor Club, where the strip-club phenomenon began; and as of 1991, claimed to be one of the largest porn stores in San Francisco.

The adult book store closed its doors in 2009. It was later replaced by a sandwich store, and is currently a cigar shop. Both businesses kept the venue's name and iconic neon sign. A San Francisco landmark, the site has been featured in several films and TV shows, on postcards, and in tourist brochures.

Big Al's in film
 Mondo Topless - by Russ Meyer, 1966 
 Dirty Harry - by Don Siegel, 1971
 Condor Club – a club in North Beach district, San Francisco
 Lusty Lady – a former chain of peep show establishments, with one location in S. F.'s North Beach district, and one in downtown Seattle
 Mitchell Brothers O'Farrell Theatre – A San Francisco striptease club
 Regal Show World – A former adult business in San Francisco
"Eye of The Tiger" music video by the band Survivor

References

Landmarks in San Francisco
North Beach, San Francisco
Sex industry in San Francisco